Billy McCaffrey (born May 30, 1971) is a former American basketball player.  He is also the former interim head coach at St. Bonaventure University.

Basketball career
McCaffrey attended Allentown Central Catholic High School in Allentown, Pennsylvania, where he played in the 1989 McDonald's All American game. 

McCaffrey began his college career at Duke University. As a sophomore, he was the team's second leading scorer during its 1991 NCAA Championship season.  He scored 16 points in the 1991 title game win over Kansas.  McCaffrey then sat out the 1991–92 season as he transferred to Vanderbilt University.

As a Commodore, McCaffrey was named a two-time All-American.  A 6'3" shooting guard, he averaged 20.6 points in both his seasons at Vanderbilt, leading the school to a high national ranking of number 5, an SEC regular season title with a 14–2 record, and number 3 regional seed in the 1993 NCAA Men's Division I Basketball Tournament where Vanderbilt lost in the Sweet 16s to Temple.  His 20.6 point average and .464 three-point field goal ranks second all-time in school history, and he is first in career free throw percentage at 88%.  He also holds the Vanderbilt record for most assists in a game, 14, scored January 13 against Kentucky. He shared SEC Player of the Year honors with Jamal Mashburn in 1993.

Following his college career, he went on to play five seasons of professional basketball in Italy, Germany, and Australia.  He played the 1996 season with the South East Melbourne Magic of the NBL.

Coaching career
McCaffrey was an assistant coach with St. Bonaventure University from 2001 to 2003 under his coach as a senior at Vanderbilt, Jan van Breda Kolff, and interim head coach in 2003 but he never coached a game. He was a University of Maine assistant coach for the 2003–04 season.

Personal life
McCaffrey's older brother Ed is a former star American football wide receiver for the New York Giants, San Francisco 49ers and Denver Broncos. He won 3 Super Bowls. He was also a standout athlete at Allentown Central Catholic High School and Stanford University. His nephews are Max, Christian, Dylan and Luke.

References

External links
St. Bonaventure coaching profile
 Duke statistics

1971 births
Living people
All-American college men's basketball players
Allentown Central Catholic High School alumni
American expatriate basketball people in Australia
American men's basketball coaches
American men's basketball players
Basketball coaches from Pennsylvania
Basketball players from Pennsylvania
Duke Blue Devils men's basketball players
Maine Black Bears men's basketball coaches
McDonald's High School All-Americans
Parade High School All-Americans (boys' basketball)
Point guards
Shooting guards
South East Melbourne Magic players
Sportspeople from Allentown, Pennsylvania
St. Bonaventure Bonnies men's basketball coaches
Vanderbilt Commodores men's basketball players